Parevia is a genus of moths in the family Erebidae.

Species
Parevia cinerea
Parevia griseata
Parevia guianensis
Parevia gurma
Parevia mathani
Parevia methaemia
Parevia parnelli
Parevia schausi
Parevia sisenna
Parevia unicolorata
Parevia vulmaria

Former species
Parevia metachryseis

References
Natural History Museum Lepidoptera generic names catalog

Phaegopterina
Moth genera